Pelgrane Press Ltd is a British role-playing game publishing company based in London and founded in 1999. It is co-owned by Simon J Rogers and Cat Tobin. It currently produces GUMSHOE System RPGs, 13th Age, the Diana Jones award-winning Hillfolk RPG, The Dying Earth Roleplaying Game, and other related products. It publishes fiction under the Stone Skin Press imprint.

History
Pelgrane Press was founded in 1999, and was initially owned by Simon Rogers, ProFantasy Software, and Sasha Bilton. It is co-owned by Simon J Rogers and Cat Tobin.

GUMSHOE System
The GUMSHOE System was designed by Robin D. Laws for running investigative, clue-finding games:

 The Esoterrorists and Fear Itself by Robin D. Laws, based on the Book of Unremitting Horror by Adrian Bott and Dave Allsop
 Trail of Cthulhu by Kenneth Hite
 Mutant City Blues, a near-future gritty police procedural Superhero setting by Robin Laws
 Ashen Stars, a darkly rebooted investigative Space Opera setting by Robin Laws
 Night's Black Agents, a game of action and espionage in a vampiric setting by Ken Hite
 TimeWatch, an investigative time travel game by Kevin Kulp
 Fall of Delta Green, a conspiracy horror game by Ken Hite set in the 1960s period of the Delta Green RPG setting
 The Yellow King, a surrealist horror game bridging four different eras by Robin D. Laws, inspired by The King in Yellow by Robert W. Chambers

GUMSHOE One-2-One is a re-imagining of the GUMSHOE system for one player, one GM gaming.
 Cthulhu Confidential

The Gaean Reach RPG and the forthcoming Yellow King RPG each combine elements with other system elements, including Skulduggery systems in the Gaean Reach and GUMSHOE One-2-One elements in The Yellow King. Similarly, Lorefinder grafts GUMSHOE investigative elements onto Paizo's Pathfinder RPG.

Other Products
 13th Age RPG
 Hillfolk
 The Dying Earth Roleplaying Game
 Skulduggery

Awards 
Pelgrane Press has won a large number of Gen Con EN World RPG Awards (the “ENnies”), including the Silver Ennie for Fan's Choice for Best Publisher (2016). The company's Gold Ennies include:
 2012: Best Electronic Book for Cthulhu Apocalypse: The Apocalypse Machine (for Trail of Cthulhu); Best Writing for The Investigator’s Guide to Occult London 
 2014: Best Adventure for Eternal Lies (for Trail of Cthulhu)
 2016: Best RPG Related Product for Ken Writes About Stuff, Volume 3; Best Supplement for The Dracula Dossier: Hawkins Papers; Best Writing and Product of the Year for The Dracula Dossier: Director's Handbook (for Night's Black Agents RPG
2019: Best Setting for The Fall of Delta Green RPG
2020: Best RPG Related Product for Absinthe in Carcosa (for the Yellow King RPG)
Press coverage has noted Pelgrane's outsized ability to accomplish significant output despite its stature: Pelgrane are a relatively small company in comparison to some of the other contenders and seeing them sweep the awards shelf is great. They are proof that at least in the table top world, quality products can still conquer the world.

See also 
 Bits and Mortar - an initiative by Pelgrane Press, one of the original founding companies in August 2010.

References

External links
 Pelgrane Press Home Page

ENnies winners
Role-playing game publishing companies